Joypur Panchanan Roy College, established in 1986, is an undergraduate college at Joypur in Howrah district, West Bengal, India. It is affiliated with the University of Calcutta.

Departments

Arts and Commerce

Bengali
English
History
Education
Physical Education
Commerce

Accreditation
Jaypur Panchanan Roy College is recognized by the University Grants Commission (UGC).

See also 
List of colleges affiliated to the University of Calcutta
Education in India
Education in West Bengal

References

External links
Joypur Panchanan Roy College

Educational institutions established in 1986
University of Calcutta affiliates
Universities and colleges in Howrah district
1986 establishments in West Bengal